Niua 17 is an electoral constituency for the Legislative Assembly in the Kingdom of Tonga. It was established for the November 2010 general election, when the multi-seat regional constituencies for People's Representatives were replaced by single-seat constituencies, electing one representative via the first past the post electoral system. It encompasses the entirety of the Niua island group, for which it is the sole constituency. (The number does not mean that it is the seventeenth in the Niuas, but in the country.) Thus, although it is technically a new constituency, it corresponds exactly to the former Niuas constituency, which also elected a single representative.

Its first ever representative is Sosefo Fe‘aomoeata Vakata, an independent first time MP. Vakata stood as a candidate for the Democratic Party of the Friendly Islands in the 2010 general election, and defeated the incumbent MP for the Niuas, independent member Sione ʻIloa. Barely two weeks after the election, however, Vakata announced that he was leaving the party, and would henceforth sit as an independent, so that he could support a noble, rather than DPFI leader ʻAkilisi Pohiva, for the premiership. He was subsequently appointed Minister for Youth, Training, Employment and Sports. He lost the seat in 2017 to Vatau Hui.

Members of Parliament

Election results

2010

References

Tongan legislative constituencies
2010 establishments in Tonga
Constituencies established in 2010
Niuas